Anders Bergström may refer to:

 Anders Bergström (cross-country skier) (born 1968), Swedish cross-country skier
 Anders Bergström (weightlifter) (born 1966), Swedish weightlifter